Alinchuvadu is a place in Moonniyoor Panchayat in the Malappuram district of Kerala in India. It is on the Chemmad - Kozhikode (Calicut) Road, about 2 km away from Chemmad. There is a Government High School (Moonniyoor Panchayat) and a Moonniyoor Nursing Home, which are both located at Alinchuvadu.

References 

Villages in Malappuram district